For the 2002–03 season, the French Division 1 was renamed as Ligue 1 and was expanded to contain 20 clubs, which played 38 matches against each other, rather than the 34 matches in previous seasons. Lyon won the 2002–03 Ligue 1 season of the French Association Football League with 68 points.

Participating teams

 AC Ajaccio
 Auxerre
 Bastia
 Bordeaux
 Guingamp
 Le Havre
 Lens
 Lille
 Lyon
 Marseille
 Monaco
 Montpellier
 Nantes
 Nice
 Paris Saint-Germain
 Rennes
 Sedan
 Sochaux
 Strasbourg
 Troyes

League table

Results

Top goalscorers

Overall
Most wins - Lyon, Monaco, Marseille and Guingamp (19)
Fewest wins - Troyes (7)
Most draws - Nice (16)
Fewest draws - Guingamp (5)
Most losses - Troyes (21)
Fewest losses - Lyon and Sochaux
Most goals scored - Monaco (66)
Fewest goals scored - Troyes (23)
Most goals conceded - Sedan (59)
Fewest goals conceded - Auxerre (29)

References

External links
 soccerway.com 
 rsssf.org

Ligue 1 seasons
France
1